Oleg Vladimirovich Bolyakin (born September 5, 1965) is a former Kazakhstani professional ice hockey player. He is honored coach of the Republic of Kazakhstan. Bolyakin is a former head coach of Yertis Pavlodar, Saryarka Karagandy, Kazzinc-Torpedo and HC Almaty. His son Evgeni Bolyakin is also hockey player.

Career
Oleg Bolyakin is the graduate of Karagandy ice hockey school. He started his career as a player of Avtomobilist Karagandy in 1981. In 1995, he invited to play in Kazakhstan National Hockey Team and played 3 games with them. In 1996, Avtomobilist Karagandy was disbanded. In 1998, he signed a contract with Amur Khabarovsk, but played only 9 games. From 1999 to 2003, he played for Yuzhny Ural Orsk at the Russian Major League.

Coaching career
2004-2007 Kazakhmys Satpaev-2 - head coach
2004-2006 Kazakhstan U20 National Team - assistant coach
2006-2007 Kazakhstan U18 National Team - assistant coach
2006-2007 Kazakhstan U20 National Team - head coach
2007-2008 Yertis Pavlodar - head coach
2009-2010 HC Saryarka - head coach
2010-2012 Kazzinc-Torpedo - head coach
2012 HC Almaty - head coach

External links

1965 births
Living people
Sportspeople from Karaganda
Kazakhstani ice hockey defencemen
Avtomobilist Karagandy players
Amur Khabarovsk players
Kazzinc-Torpedo head coaches
Kazakhstani ice hockey coaches
Soviet ice hockey defencemen